The Portuguese Natural Gas Association, founded in December 2010, is a non-profit association, based in Lisbon, Portugal. Its bylaws define AGN as a scientific, technical and professional association, establishing itself as the representative body for the sector.

Organization

Governing Board 
The Governing Board is the association's highest representative body, and fulfills decisions made in the General Assembly. The Governing Board is formed by seven to nine members elected in the General Assembly: one President, two Vice-Presidents, and, variably, four to six advisors. The Governing Board will be assembled as many times as considered necessary and has at least one meeting per month.

Standing Committees and Working Committees 
AGN has two Standing Committees formed by specialists of associated companies; one is dedicated to natural gas infra-structure issues, and the other to retail issues. Other working committees may be established for specific issues.  The committees are a permanent part of AGN's Governing Body.

References

External links 
 
 Eurogás
 International Gas Union
 Marcogaz
 News article in Jornal de Negócios (Portuguese)

Natural gas organizations
Organisations based in Lisbon